Minuscule 235 (in the Gregory-Aland numbering), ε 456 (Soden), known as Codex Havniensis 2 is a Greek minuscule manuscript of the New Testament, on paper. It is dated by a colophon to the year 1314. The manuscript has complex contents. It has marginalia.

Description 

The codex contains a complete text of the four Gospels, on 280 paper leaves (size ). The text is written in one column per page, 23 lines per page (size of column 15.2 by 9.5 cm), the capital letters in red. 
The initials at the beginning of Matthew and Mark are the same as in Lectionary 6.

The text is divided according to the Ammonian Sections, whose numbers are given at the margin. The words are often ill divided and the stops misplaced (as in minuscule 80).

Text 

The Greek text of the codex is a representative of the Byzantine text-type. Aland placed it in Category V.
According to the Claremont Profile Method it represents textual family Kx in Luke 10 and Luke 20. In Luke 1 it has mixed Byzantine text.

The text often agrees with D, K, 33, Philoxenian Syriac. Hermann von Soden lists it as Is (along with codices 157, 245, 291, 713, 1012), but Soden examined it only in the Gospel of John.

History 

The manuscript was written by the hand of Philothens, a monk. It was bought at Venice by Friedrich Rostgaard in 1699. It was examined by C. G. Hensler (1784) and Charles Graux (1878). C. R. Gregory saw it in 1878 and in 1891.

It is currently housed at the Det Kongelige Bibliotek (GkS 1323, 4) at Copenhagen.

See also 

 List of New Testament minuscules
 Biblical manuscript
 Textual criticism

References

Further reading 

 Charles Graux, Notices sommaires des manuscritti grecs de la grande bibliotheque royale de Copenhague, Paris 1879.

External links 

 Minuscule 235 at the Encyclopedia of Textual Criticism

Greek New Testament minuscules
Royal Library, Denmark
13th-century biblical manuscripts